Levoglucosenone is a bridged, unsaturated heterocyclic ketone formed from levoglucosan by loss of two molecules of water. It is the major component produced during the acid-catalysed pyrolysis of cellulose, D-glucose, and levoglucosan.

History 
The compound was first identified in 1970 as a product of the thermal decomposition of cellulose.

Production 

The primary way of obtaining levoglucosenone is via pyrolysis of carbohydrates, particularly cellulose. Levoglucosenone can be derived from biomass or from other cellulosic materials including domestic/commercial waste paper. The availability of multiple sources is a key advantage when compared to other platform chemicals which are solely derived from biomass.

When cellulose in tetrahydrofuran is heated to 210 °C with low concentrations of sulfuric acid in an autoclave, up to 51% levoglucosenone can be obtained through a solvent-assisted pyrolysis. Under optimized laboratory conditions, yields of up to 95% of levoglucosenone can be reached.

Selectivity can be improved using an acid catalyst, such as phosphoric acid. Zeolites and solid superacids can also be used, as well as ionic liquids. A sample of microcrystalline cellulose is first pretreated with catalytic amounts of an acid, such as phosphoric acid, and then heated to 270-300°C, affording a bio-oil. Alongside levoglucosenone as a major product, 2-furfuraldehyde is also formed in significant quantities as an impurity at 5-10%. The bio-oil can be vacuum distilled, resulting in purified levoglucosenone. 

The use of polar, aprotic solvents such as THF, γ-valerolactone and sulfolane has been found to improve pyrolytic yields, as the solvents cause swelling of the cellulose and inhibit repolymerisation back to levoglucosan. These solvents also promote catalytic dehydration of levoglucosan to levoglucosenone. 

Microwave irradiation of microcrystalline cellulose can also be used to produce levoglucosenone.

Cellulose-containing waste from biorefineries can also be converted into 6-8% LGO under microwave irradiation in addition to the usual decomposition products such as hydroxymethylfurfural HMF, formic acid, formaldehyde, CO2 and water.

Uses 
As a highly functionalized, chiral compound, levoglucosenone has uses as a building block in organic synthesis to produce a wide variety of natural and non-natural compounds. Recently, the Australian company Circa developed the Furacell™ technology, a continuous process to convert a wide range of cellulosic biomass into levoglucosenone. From then on, levoglucosenone has been considered a promising bio-renewable platform for the production of commodity chemicals, being especially interesting the new insight provided by Huber and co-workers into how to transform this molecule into α,ω-diols, monomers for the production of polyesters and polyurethanes.

Nowadays, the spotlight is on the use of heterogeneous catalysts to yield hydrogenation and hydrogenolysis derived products. In this sense, Pd supported on carbon, alumina, and silica-alumina can be used to obtain a variety of products via hydrogenation (i.e. dihydrolevoglucosenone and levoglucosanol),  and hydrogenolysis (i.e. tetrahydrofurandimethanol (THFDM) and 1,6-hexanediol), tuning the selectivity by simply changing reaction conditions. More recently, Pd and Pt supported on zirconium oxide proved to be efficient catalysts to obtain either dihydrolevoglucosenone or levoglucosanol, respectively, under mild reaction conditions, taking advantage of the different selectivity of these metals towards the hydrogenation of specific functional features.

In recent times, Levoglucosenone has also been proven to be an interesting Michael acceptor towards the high regio- and stereoselective formation of various building-blocks via a photocatalysed radical addition mediated by tetra-n-butylammonium decatungstate.

See also
Dihydrolevoglucosenone

References 

Enones
Oxygen heterocycles